Eleanor Margaret Acland, née Cropper (1878 – 12 December 1933) was a British Liberal Party politician, suffragist, and novelist. Until 1895 she was known as Eleanor Cropper, from 1895 to 1926 she was known as Eleanor Acland, and from 1926 to her death in 1933 she was known as Lady Acland. She served as president of the Women's Liberal Federation.

Background

Eleanor Margaret Cropper was born the daughter of Charles James Cropper and Hon. Edith Emily Holland in the Lake District. She was educated at St Leonards School. On 31 August 1905 she married Francis Dyke Acland, the son of a prominent Liberal Party baronet. They had three sons and one daughter. Francis Acland was to sit as a Liberal MP. Her eldest son Richard Acland also sat as a Liberal MP, and her son Geoffrey Acland also stood as a Liberal candidate. The other children were Cuthbert Henry Dyke Acland, who was High Sheriff of Westmorland, and Eleanor Edith Dyke Acland, who died in 1923 aged 10. In 1926, when her husband succeeded to the family baronetcy, she became Lady Acland.

Professional career
Eleanor Acland was an author of novels. She wrote In the Straits of Hope (1904), a novel about artists in Chelsea, and Dark Side Out (1921), a multi-generational family saga. She also wrote two memoirs, Ellen Acland: The Story of a Joyful Life (1925), about her daughter, and Goodbye for the Present, published posthumously in 1935.

Political career
Eleanor Acland was a passionate advocate of Votes for Women and was an active suffragist. In 1912 she organised local Women's Liberal Associations to pass resolutions in support of the 1912 Conciliation Bill. In 1913 she founded the Liberal Women's Suffrage Union.

In 1929 Lady Acland was elected President of the Women's Liberal Federation. She served a two-year term of office. In 1931 when Sir Herbert Samuel led the Liberal Party into the National Government, she supported him. She was one of the eight signatories to the 1931 Liberal Party Election Manifesto. She was Liberal candidate for the Exeter division of Devon at the 1931 General Election. No Liberal candidate had run at the previous general election in 1929, when the Conservative vote split between two candidates. In 1931 her intervention pushed the Labour candidate down to third place. However, in a UK-wide election in which the Conservatives polled well, she finished behind the Conservative candidate, who also supported the National Government. She did not stand for parliament again.

Electoral record

References

1878 births
1933 deaths
Liberal Party (UK) parliamentary candidates
People educated at St Leonards School
English suffragists
Eleanor
Wives of baronets